In second-language acquisition, the Acculturation Model is a theory proposed by John Schumann to describe the acquisition process of a second language (L2) by members of ethnic minorities that typically include immigrants, migrant workers, or the children of such groups. This acquisition process takes place in natural contexts of majority language setting. The main suggestion of the theory is that the acquisition of a second language is directly linked to the acculturation process, and learners’ success is determined by the extent to which they can orient themselves to the target language culture.

Background
The acculturation model came into light with Schumann’s study of six non-English learners where one learner named Alberto, unlike the other five, had little progress in the acquisition process of English.

Description
The process of acculturation was defined by Brown as "the process of being adapted to a new culture" which involves a new orientation of thinking and feeling on the part of an L2 learner. According to Brown, as culture is an integral part of a human being, the process of acculturation takes a deeper turn when the issue of language is brought on the scene. Schumann based his Acculturation Model on two sets of factors: social and psychological. Schumann asserts that the degree to which the second-language learners acculturate themselves towards the culture of target-language (TL) group generally depends on social and psychological factors; and these two sorts of factors will determine respectively the level of social distance and psychological distance an L2 learner is having in course of his learning the target-language. Social distance, as Ellis notes, concerns the extent to which individual learners can identify themselves with members of TL group and, thereby, can achieve contact with them. Psychological distance is the extent to which individual learners are at ease with their target-language learning task. Schumann identifies eight factors that influence social distance: social dominance, integration pattern, enclosure, cohesiveness, size factor, cultural congruence, attitude factor, and intended length of residence. He also identifies three factors that influence psychological distance: motivation, attitude, and culture shock. Schumann later sought to extend the acculturation model by assessing contemporary cognitive models for second language acquisition, including McLaughlin’s cognitive theory, Hatch and Hawkins’ experiential approach, Bialystok and Ryan’s model of knowledge and control dimensions, Anderson’s active control of thought framework, and Gasser's connectionist lexical memory framework.

See also
 Second-language acquisition

External links
 Acculturation Model on SLAEncyclopediaSp11

References

Applied linguistics
Bilingualism
Language acquisition
Language education
Second-language acquisition